Wahbanosay (Waabanose in the Fiero spelling, meaning "Walks in the Dawn") (fl. 1778 - d. 1806) was a Mississaugas chief of the Eagle doodem, in the Burlington, Ontario area.  He was the negotiator for the Mississaugas of the Gunshot treaty in 1783.  Wahbanosay was also a signatory to land surrender #8 in 1797 of lands in the Burlington Heights area, the Toronto Purchase in 1805, and Surrender #14, which surrendered additional lands in the Burlington area in 1806.

During the 1790s, Wahbanosay worked as a guide for Deputy Surveyor General Augustus Jones, who married his daughter Tuhbenahneequay.  The couple had two children; John Jones and Peter Jones.

References

Ojibwe people
Political office-holders of Indigenous governments in Canada
1806 deaths
Year of birth missing